The Bizarre was a second rank two-decker ship of the line of the French Royal Navy. She was armed with 68 guns, comprising twenty-six 24-pounder guns on the lower deck and twenty-eight 12-pounder guns on the upper deck, with eight 6-pounder guns on the quarterdeck and six 6-pounder guns on the forecastle.

Designed and built under contract by Félix Arnaud, she was begun at Bayonne in May 1691. She was launched in the autumn of 1692 and completed in May 1693.

The Bizarre took part in the Battle of Lagos on 28 June 1693. In July 1707 she was scuttled at Toulon to avoid capture by the English and Dutch squadron during the attack on that port, but was refloated. unserviceable by 1718, she was retained at Toulon until 1727 when she was taken to pieces by the end of that year.

Notes and citations

References
 
 Nomenclature des Vaisseaux du Roi-Soleil de 1661 a 1715. Alain Demerliac (Editions Omega, Nice – various dates).
 The Sun King's Vessels (2015) - Jean-Claude Lemineur; English translation by François Fougerat. Editions ANCRE.  
 Winfield, Rif and Roberts, Stephen (2017) French Warships in the Age of Sail 1626-1786: Design, Construction, Careers and Fates. Seaforth Publishing. .

Ships of the line of the French Navy
1690s ships
Ships built in France